Here Comes the Weekend may refer to:

"Here Comes the Weekend", a song by Dave Edmunds from the album Get It (1977)
"Here Comes the Weekend", a song by The Jam from the album This Is the Modern World (1977)
"Here Comes the Weekend", a song by Pink from the album The Truth About Love (2012)
"Here Comes the Weekend", a song by Roxette from the album Tourism (1992)